Jowita Przystał (born 22 August 1994) is a Polish ballroom dancer. She is known for appearing on The Greatest Dancer and Strictly Come Dancing as a professional.

Career
Przystał and her partner Michael Danilczuk have represented Poland in national and international competitions. In 2014 they became Polish Open Latin Champions. They have also performed with Burn the Floor. Przystał and Danilczuk have also performed in Broadway musical productions such as Legally Blonde, Priscilla, Queen of the Desert and Rock of Ages. They moved to London in 2019 to pursue careers in the United Kingdom. In 2020, Przystał and Danilczuk appeared on The Greatest Dancer. They were crowned winners of the second series. The prize was £50,000 and an opportunity to perform on the next series of BBC One's Strictly Come Dancing. In 2021, Przystał joined the nineteenth series of Strictly Come Dancing as a professional.

Strictly Come Dancing
Przystał started her Strictly career in the nineteenth series, but was not partnered with a celebrity, only appearing in group dances. For the twentieth series, she received her first celebrity partner, cameraman and presenter Hamza Yassin. On 17 December 2022, they were announced the series champions, after beating Helen Skelton and Gorka Marquez, Fleur East and Vito Coppola, and Molly Rainford and Carlos Gu in the final. She is the fifth professional dancer and first ever female pro dancer to win their first series with a celebrity partner.

Series 20 – with celebrity partner Hamza Yassin

 number indicates when Hamza & Jowita were at the top of the leaderboard.
 number indicates when Hamza & Jowita were at the bottom of the leaderboard.

Strictly Come Dancing Christmas Special
She danced with Adrian Chiles for 2021's Strictly Come Dancing Christmas Special.

Dance tours 
In November 2022, Przystal announced she was to appear with Nikita Kuzmin in Dancing With The Stars Weekends (2023).

References 

Living people
Polish ballroom dancers
1994 births
Strictly Come Dancing winners
People from Kraków
Polish expatriates in England
21st-century Polish women
Polish female dancers